High Street is a 1976 Belgian drama film directed by André Ernotte. The film was selected as the Belgian entry for the Best Foreign Language Film at the 49th Academy Awards, but was not accepted as a nominee.

Cast
 Annie Cordy as Mimi
 Mort Shuman as Painter David Reinhardt
 Bert Struys as L'homme
 Guy Verda as Gérard
 Anne Marisse as Sandra
 Elliot Tiber as Mike
 Nadia Gary as Valérie
 Raymond Peira as Le docteur

See also
 List of submissions to the 49th Academy Awards for Best Foreign Language Film
 List of Belgian submissions for the Academy Award for Best Foreign Language Film

References

External links
 

1976 films
1970s French-language films
1976 drama films
Films directed by André Ernotte
Belgian drama films
French-language Belgian films